Randal W. Hill (born September 26, 1967) is a Texas entrepreneur and business leader. Hill gained his reputation as entrepreneur after spearheading the use of semi trailers that had been converted to transport, as well as dry, agricultural products. Hill has been honored as Republican Business Leader of the Year by the National Republican Congressional Committee, named Distinguished Alumni of the Year by Dallas Christian School and by appointment of Governor Rick Perry serves on the Texas Emerging Technology Fund (TETF).

In 2011, Hill formed a NASCAR team, Randy Hill Racing.

Early life 
Hill was born in Dallas, TX and raised in the Dallas areas of Oak Cliff and Garland. He graduated from Dallas Christian High School in 1986 and enrolled in Abilene Christian University. While attending ACU, he played on the football team as a defensive tackle. He graduated with a degree in Journalism/Mass Comm.

Career 
Hill learned the inner workings of the semi trailer trade as a sales representative for Transport International Pool, a subsidiary of GE Capital. The company leased and sold trailers that were marketed exclusively as a mode of transport. In 1995, Hill left TIP to start Advanced Trailer.

In the mid-1990s, retailers began seeking large storage spaces for seasonal increases in inventories. Knowing that GE Capital and Trans America retired trailers after their use as transport, Hill began purchasing the retired trailers and converting them to storage trailers. Advanced Trailer was also amongst the first to convert ocean containers from steam ship lines for public use as storage facilities. The ability to recognize potential in what other industries regarded as cast offs allowed Hill to bring a break through concept to practical application.

In 1996, researchers at Texas Tech University in Lubbock developed a more efficient method of transporting and drying peanuts. For generations, the important process of drying peanuts after harvest was done in small steel wagons called "buggies" that were often pulled by farm trucks. The idea of using semi trailers expanded after Advanced Trailer sold the first trailers for modification to farmers in West Texas. Advanced Trailer filled orders from West Texas to the Southeastern United States, eventually opening a facility in Vienna, GA. Since designing the drying trailer, Advanced Trailer has filled orders in eleven states and four countries.

Hill has continued to develop possibilities beyond current usage of the trailers. In addition to peanuts, the trailers have been used to dry grass seed, hay, almonds, and macadamia nuts. His most recent work has been with heavy haul transportation and large equipment trailers used in oil and gas exploration, wind energy, and military use. Hill's current patents include provisions for drying key products in the development of biofuel; biomass energy generation in western Texas is an issue Hill is attempting to spearhead.

Personal life 
Randy, his wife Janeé, and son Randal Harrell Hill reside in  Fort Worth, TX. Randy has three daughters, Miranda, Maggie and Macie, who live in Abilene. Randy has a lifelong interest in ranching and enjoys hunting and fishing in West Texas in his spare time. He is a member of the ACU Letterman's Association. Randy enjoys numerous philanthropic efforts, including significant participation in community projects at Abilene Christian University and Dallas Christian School.

Hill also started Randy Hill Racing, a racing team competing in the ARCA Racing Series and NASCAR Nationwide Series, in 2011.

References

External links 
 
 

Living people
1967 births
People from Garland, Texas
Abilene Christian Wildcats football players
NASCAR team owners